When Trumpets Fade is a 1998 HBO television movie directed by John Irvin and starring Ron Eldard, Frank Whaley, Zak Orth, and Dylan Bruno. First released on June 27, 1998, the film is set in World War II during the Battle of the Hürtgen Forest.

Plot
Private David Manning is a soldier in the 28th Infantry Division, and as a result of the horrendous fighting in the Battle of the Hürtgen Forest, he is the sole survivor of his platoon. Manning is assigned to lead a squad of green reinforcements and promoted to sergeant. He tries to get out of it, saying he is unqualified for the position, but his company commander, Captain Roy Pritchett, thinks otherwise. Manning then tries to back out of responsibility by asking to be discharged under Section 8 (designating him mentally unfit due to combat stress), but his request is denied.

Manning meets with his new men and later that evening, leads them into position on the line. The next morning, while on patrol with his squad, Manning puts Private Warren Sanderson on point. However, Sanderson goes forward too quickly and gets separated from the squad, before narrowly avoiding contact with the enemy. After some time, Manning decides the squad must leave without Sanderson right before the latter returns. After this incident, Manning is scorned by his peers and berated by his platoon leader, First Lieutenant Terrence Lukas. Manning's company makes a push toward the town of Schmidt in order to take and hold a key bridge. However, they move into an enemy minefield and are shelled by 88 mm guns. The company retreats, and Pritchett comes to Manning with a volunteer mission to destroy the guns, before promising to offer Manning a Section 8 if he volunteers for and succeeds on the mission.

During the mission, one of Manning's men, Private Sam Baxter, panics and starts to flee, and the other men follow suit. To stop them, Manning shoots Baxter, hitting the flamethrower he is carrying on his back, which causes it to explode and burn him to death. Although the rest of Manning's men are horrified by this, they stop fleeing and assault the position where the two 88 mm guns are located. Led by Sanderson, who is armed with another flamethrower, the group eventually succeeds in destroying the guns. Manning's company eventually secures the bridge after suffering heavy casualties, but is soon attacked by German tanks and forced to retreat. During the squad's retreat back to the American lines, Lonnie is killed and Despin is captured. Manning and Sanderson manage to escape, but Pritchett, who has also survived the ordeal, cracks under pressure and is ordered off the lines before he can uphold his promise to Manning.

When the battalion commander, Lieutenant Colonel George Rickman, appears and asks him about the status of his platoon, a traumatized Lukas snaps and assaults him. Manning confronts Rickman as the despondent Lukas is led away, picks up the mass of blood-soaked dog tags Lukas dropped, and presses them against Rickman's chest as his answer to the platoon's status. As a result of Manning's insubordination, Rickman orders him to the command post. He subsequently promotes Manning to second lieutenant and gives him command of the platoon.

After an altercation with Talbot and Manning's friend, Corporal Toby Chamberlain, the platoon medic, in which they confront Manning for shooting Baxter, Manning tells them of a plan to destroy the German tanks the night before the assault. Chamberlain states they have no proof that Manning will not just shoot them as he did Baxter. Sanderson, who survived the retreat, defends Manning's conduct by acknowledging the fact that everybody would have fled instead of fighting had Manning not shot Baxter. Manning also informs them that the battalion is making another push in the morning, and that if they do not destroy the tanks, then the entire battalion - including them - will be in jeopardy.

Manning leads Talbot, Chamberlain, and Sanderson in a pre-dawn raid on the German tanks, without the battalion's knowledge or support. Manning clears a minefield and cuts a barbed wire obstacle, enabling the group to continue on, before they destroy the tanks with a bazooka. The operation costs the lives of all but Manning and Sanderson, and Manning is severely wounded. While being carried back to friendly lines by Sanderson, Manning loses consciousness from his wounds. An epilogue states that after three months of heavy combat, the Allies eventually took the Hürtgen Forest and that the battle itself was overshadowed by the Battle of the Bulge soon afterward.

Cast
Ron Eldard as Private, Sergeant, and then Second Lieutenant David Manning, who progresses from greenie, to squad leader, to platoon leader in C Company
Zak Orth as Private Warren "Sandy" Sanderson, a replacement in Manning's squad
Frank Whaley as Corporal Toby Chamberlain, a medic attached to C Company
Dylan Bruno as Sergeant Patrick Talbot, a squad leader in Lukas' platoon
Devon Gummersall as Private Andrew Lonnie, a replacement in Manning's squad
Dan Futterman as Private Doug Despin, a replacement in Manning's squad
Steven Petrarca as Private Sam Baxter, a replacement in Manning's squad
Dwight Yoakam as Lieutenant Colonel George Rickman, the battalion commander of First Battalion
Martin Donovan as Captain Roy Pritchett, the company commander of C Company, First Battalion
Timothy Olyphant as 1st Lieutenant Terrence Lukas, the leader of Manning and Talbot's platoon
Jeffrey Donovan as Private Robert "Bobby" Miller, a fellow soldier of Manning's
Bobby Cannavale as Captain Thomas Zenek, the new commander of C Company
  as Oberfeldwebel, a German Army patrol leader

Production

When Trumpets Fade was filmed on location in Budapest, Lake Balaton, and Lake Balentine, Hungary, and in Calgary, Alberta, Canada.  
US troops supporting Operation Joint Guard, stationed in Taszar, Hungary, were used as extras on the set.

Awards

John Irvin won the Silver FIPA Award for Best Director for the film at the Biarritz International Festival in 1999.

The film was also nominated for best cinematography (by Thomas Burstyn) by the American Society of Cinematographers and best sound editing by the Motion Picture Sound Editors, and Ron Eldard was nominated for best actor at the Seattle International Film Festival.

References

External links

Western Front of World War II films
1990s war films
American war films
HBO Films films
1998 television films
1998 films
Films directed by John Irvin
Films produced by John Kemeny
Films set in Germany
Films set in 1944
Films shot in Budapest
Films shot in Hungary
Films shot in Alberta
World War II films based on actual events
1990s American films